The men's 4 × 400 metres relay at the 2016 IPC Athletics European Championships were held at the Stadio Olimpico Carlo Zecchini in Grosseto from 11–16 June. The men's T53/54 relay was a non-medal event.

Medalists

See also
List of IPC world records in athletics

References

4 x 400 metres relay